Bruno Heppell (born February 14, 1972) is a former Canadian football fullback who played eight seasons with the Montreal Alouettes of the Canadian Football League (CFL) and now football commentator at RDS TV network. He was drafted by the Alouettes in the third round of the 1997 CFL Draft. He played college football at Western Michigan University.

References

External links
Just Sports Stats
College stats
#33 Bruno HEPPELL bio

Living people
1972 births
Players of Canadian football from Quebec
Canadian football fullbacks
Canadian football running backs
Western Michigan Broncos football players
Montreal Alouettes players
People from La Prairie, Quebec